All's Well That Ends Well is the twelfth album by the Welsh rock band Man and their final album before splitting up for the first time at the end of 1976. It was recorded live at London's Roundhouse and is the band's third live album.

Track listing

Re-Release 2014 
In 2014 Esoteric Records released a completely remastered issue of All's Well That Ends Well. It is the original album release remastered from the original 24-track tapes and select recordings of the shows from 10 and 11 December 1976 of the three night stint at the Roundhouse. The recordings are a mix of the in-house recordings done by the Roundhouse sound team and the Manor Mobile recordings who also did the gig. This was the last line up until the band reformed in 1984, and captures most of the consistent members who played in Man, other than Micky Jones who never left it.

The Tracks 2-6 are from the 10th and track 1 is from the 11th shows.

The tracks 1-3 are from the 10th and tracks 4-6 are from the 11th shows.

Personnel 
 Micky Jones – vocals & guitar
 Deke Leonard – vocals & guitar 
 Phil Ryan – vocals & keyboards 
 John McKenzie – vocals & bass 
 Terry Williams – vocals & drums

Credits 
 Mixing – Doug Bennett, Jeffrey Hooper

References

External links 
 
 Man - All's Well That Ends Well (1977) biography by Stewart Mason, discography and album reviews, credits & releases at AllMusic.com
 
 Man - All's Well That Ends Well (1977) biography, discography, album credits & user reviews at ProgArchives.com
 Man - All's Well That Ends Well (1977) album to be listened as stream at Play.Spotify.com

1978 live albums
Man (band) live albums
MCA Records live albums